Alejandro Dominguez or Alejandro Domínguez may refer to:

Alejandro Domínguez (footballer, born 1981), Argentinian footballer
Alejandro Domínguez Coello (c. 1950–2005), Mexican chief of police
Alejandro Domínguez (Mexican footballer) (born 1961), appeared at the 1986 FIFA World Cup
Alejandro Domínguez (football executive) (born 1972), Paraguayan football administrator, president of CONMEBOL

See also
Alex Dominguez (disambiguation)